Sylvia Bernstein (sometimes credited as Sylvia Bernstein Seid or Sylvia Seid) was an American screenwriter and playwright active in Hollywood in the late 1920s.

He was born in Brooklyn, and her father was screenwriter Isadore Bernstein. She was of Jewish ancestry. She eventually moved out to Los Angeles with her family, where she began working as a screenwriter. She was married twice: first to Louis Banks and then to John Hartley Seid.

Selected filmography 

 The Lariat Kid (1929)
 One Splendid Hour (1929)
 Montmartre Rose (1929)
 The Royal Rider (1929)
 Wild Beauty (1927)

References 

Jewish American screenwriters
American women screenwriters
1900 births
1979 deaths
Screenwriters from New York (state)
20th-century American women writers
20th-century American screenwriters
20th-century American Jews